Miles Davis All Stars, Volume 2 (PRLP 200) is a 10-inch LP album by Miles Davis, recorded in 1954 for Prestige Records. The two side-long tracks on this LP, and two others, were recorded at Rudy Van Gelder's Studio, Hackensack, New Jersey, on December 24, 1954. This was the second of two 10" LPs sourced from the same session, which featured two of Davis’s major be-bop contemporaries: pianist/composer Thelonious Monk and vibraphonist Milt Jackson, along with the same rhythm section that had been used on Davis's other recent albums - bassist Percy Heath and drummer Kenny Clarke. Jackson, Heath and Clarke were three-quarters of the Modern Jazz Quartet at this time.

After the 10" LP format was discontinued, both tracks were reissued on  the 12" LP Miles Davis and the Modern Jazz Giants (PRLP 7150), along with "Swing Spring" from Volume 1 (PRLP 196), a previously unreleased alternate take of "The Man I Love", from the same session, and an unrelated track from a later session with his First Great Quintet.

This would be the last Miles Davis LP issued by Prestige in the short-lived 10" format. His next album, Musings of Miles (PRLP 7007), would be his first 12" LP, followed by Dig (PRLP 7012), which would be the first to repackage the older 10" material. Alternating albums of new and repackaged material would follow, until all the early Prestige material was now available in the new format.

Track listing

Personnel
 Miles Davis – trumpet
 Milt Jackson – vibraharp
 Thelonious Monk – piano
 Percy Heath – bass
 Kenny Clarke – drums

References

1955 albums
Miles Davis albums
Prestige Records albums
Albums produced by Bob Weinstock
Albums recorded at Van Gelder Studio
Sequel albums